The Colalura Sandstone is a Middle Jurassic geologic formation of the Perth Basin of Western Australia. The formation overlies the Moonyoonooka Sandstone.

Dinosaur remains have been recovered from the formation.

Vertebrate paleofauna 
Few remains of the sandstone have been assigned to a genus. Unassigned remains include rare reptilian bones such as an isolated plesiosaur vertebra and paddle.

Flora 
Petrified wood is very common in the Colalura Sandstone.

See also 
 List of dinosaur-bearing rock formations
 List of stratigraphic units with few dinosaur genera

References 

Geologic formations of Australia
Jurassic System of Australia
Bajocian Stage
Sandstone formations
Conglomerate formations
Shallow marine deposits
Geology of Western Australia